Apterocyclus munroi is a species of stag beetle in the family Lucanidae. It was found on the island of Kauai in the Hawaiian Islands in 1897.

Four specimens of Apterocyclus munroi were collected on Kauai in 1897, and the species description was published in 1908. No specimens have been identified since 1897, and the species may now be extinct.

References

Further reading

External links

 

Lucaninae
Beetles of Oceania
Insects of Hawaii
Endemic fauna of Hawaii
Beetles described in 1908